Fountainhead-Orchard Hills is a census-designated place (CDP) in Washington County, Maryland, United States. The population was 3,861 at the 2000 census.

Geography
Fountainhead-Orchard Hills is located at  (39.682933, −77.716526).

Demographics

At the 2000 census there were 3,844 people, 1,546 households, and 1,119 families living in the CDP. The racial makeup of the CDP was 94.35% White, 2.29% African American, 0.10% Native American, 1.90% Asian, 0.03% Pacific Islander, 0.31% from other races, and 1.01% from two or more races. Hispanic or Latino of any race were 1.59%.

Of the 1,546 households 27.7% had children under the age of 18 living with them, 62.8% were married couples living together, 6.5% had a female householder with no husband present, and 27.6% were non-families. 23.9% of households were one person and 14.9% were one person aged 65 or older. The average household size was 2.40 and the average family size was 2.81.

The age distribution was 21.6% under the age of 18, 4.6% from 18 to 24, 22.8% from 25 to 44, 27.3% from 45 to 64, and 23.7% 65 or older. The median age was 46 years. For every 100 females, there were 93.7 males. For every 100 females age 18 and over, there were 90.0 males.

The median household income was $49,648 and the median family income  was $60,840. Males had a median income of $38,636 versus $26,905 for females. The per capita income for the CDP was $27,552. About 1.7% of families and 3.1% of the population were below the poverty line, including 2.5% of those under age 18 and 2.7% of those age 65 or over.

References

Census-designated places in Washington County, Maryland
Census-designated places in Maryland